Oidaematophorus lindseyi is a moth of the family Pterophoridae that is found in North America, including Alberta.

References

Oidaematophorini
Moths described in 1923
Moths of North America